Southern Comfort is a brand of liqueur.

Southern Comfort may also refer to:

Music
Matthews Southern Comfort, a band headed by Iain Matthews formed in 1969
"Southern Comfort", a 1990 song by Suzi Quatro from Oh, Suzi Q.

Albums
Southern Comfort (Anthony Hamilton album), 2007
Southern Comfort (Conway Twitty album) or the title song, 1982 
Southern Comfort (The Crusaders album) or the title song, 1974
Southern Comfort (Frank Wess album) or the title song, 1962
Southern Comfort, by Psychic TV
The Southern Comfort, by Emil Bulls, or the title song, 2005

Other uses
Southern Comfort Conference, an annual conference for people affected by transgender issues, formed in 1991 
Southern Comfort (1981 film), an American film by Walter Hill
Southern Comfort (2001 film), a documentary film that takes its name from the annual conference